Leland Everett Fenner  (November 10, 1895May 7, 1964) was an end who played thirteen seasons with the Dayton Triangles in the National Football League and one with the Portsmouth Spartans.

References

1895 births
1964 deaths
People from Miamisburg, Ohio
Players of American football from Ohio
American football running backs
Dayton Triangles players
Portsmouth Spartans players